Catoctin Furnace (also known as Catoctin Iron Furnace) is a historic iron forge located on Route 15 between Frederick and Thurmont in Catoctin Furnace, Maryland. The smelting blast furnace is shown. No forge is at the site now. Forges were present when the ironworks was operational.

History

Catoctin Furnace was constructed in 1774 by four brothers Thomas, Baker, Roger and James Johnson to produce pig iron from locally mined hematite.
In blast by 1776,
the furnace provided ammunition (cannonballs) for the American Revolutionary War.
Some sources state that it also provided cannon.
however that is considered unlikely by researchers.
Slaves operated the furnace during this time.
The Johnson brothers owned the furnaces at the site at first collectively,
and after 1793 singly, until 1811.

Ultimately, three furnaces were built at the site, each named for the site.
The first Catoctin Furnace was rebuilt a short distance away in 1787.
The second, named Isabella was built in the 1850s by Jacob Kunkel (references give dates from 1853 to 1867).
It still stands, within Cunningham Falls State Park.

The first two furnaces burned charcoal.
The third, which opened in 1873, burned coke (some sources say anthracite coal, though this would be more costly).
The entire complex closed in 1903 (attributed to rising costs and the too-late introduction of a rail link).

Present day

The furnace's remains are located in Cunningham Falls State Park.  A walking-tour handout is available in the park's visitor center.

In 1973, the Catoctin Furnace Historical Society, Inc. was formed by G. Eugene Anderson, Clement E. Gardiner, J. Franklin Mentzer, and Earl M. Shankle to “foster and promote the restoration of the Catoctin Furnace Historic District…and to maintain the same exclusively for educational and scientific purposes…to exhibit to coming generations our heritage of the past…” The Catoctin Furnace Historical Society, Inc., celebrates, studies, and preserves the rich history of this pre-revolutionary industrial village, including the architecture, cultural landscapes, lifeways, and foodways of the workers.

See also
Catoctin Mountain
Cunningham Falls State Park
Thomas Johnson (jurist)

References

External links

WESTERN REGION Catoctin Mountain Byway
Bringing history into classrooms: Reconstructing a colonial supply chain
Catoctin Iron Furnace - No Time For War
Cunningham Falls State Park: Catoctin Furnace
Catoctin Furnace at Cunningham Falls State Park

Catoctin Furnace Historic District NRHP Nomination Form at Maryland State Archives
Catoctin Furnace Historical Society

Industrial buildings completed in 1774
Pre-statehood history of Maryland
Ironworks and steel mills in Maryland
Buildings and structures in Frederick County, Maryland
Industrial buildings and structures on the National Register of Historic Places in Maryland
Tourist attractions in Frederick County, Maryland
Historic American Buildings Survey in Maryland
Historic districts on the National Register of Historic Places in Maryland
National Register of Historic Places in Frederick County, Maryland
Defunct manufacturing companies based in Maryland
Thomas Johnson family